Ostuni is a railway station near the Italian town of Ostuni, in the Province of Brindisi, Apulia. The station lies on the Adriatic Railway (Ancona–Lecce) and was opened in 1865. The train services are operated by Trenitalia.

Train services
The station is served by the following service(s):

Intercity services Bologna - Rimini - Ancona - Pescara - Foggia - Bari - Brindisi - Lecce
Intercity services Milan - Reggio Emilia - Bologna - Rimini - Ancona - Pescara - Foggia - Bari - Brindisi - Lecce
Night train (Intercity Notte) Rome - Foggia - Bari - Brindisi - Lecce
Night train (Intercity Notte) Milan - Parma - Bologna - Ancona - Pescara - Foggia - Bari - Brindisi - Lecce
Night train (Intercity Notte) Turin - Alessandria - Bologna - Ancona - Pescara - Foggia - Bari - Brindisi - Lecce
Regional services (Treno regionale) Foggia - Barletta - Bari - Monopoli - Brindisi - Lecce

See also
Railway stations in Italy
List of railway stations in Apulia
Rail transport in Italy
History of rail transport in Italy

References

External links

This article is based upon a translation of the Italian language version as at May 2014.

Railway stations in Apulia
Railway stations opened in 1865
Buildings and structures in the Province of Brindisi